Agbotomokekere (born  May 4, 1935 1354AH) is a Nigerian religious leader. He is the Chief Imam of Ibadanland. He became Imam Abdul-Ganiyy AbuBakr Agbotomokekere Oke-Koto in 2015.

Early life

Sheikh A’bdul Ganiyy was the son of Abuubakr Agbotomokekere (Gatta or Gaataa), son of As-shaykh Abu Bakr Agbotomokekere, son of Muhammad, son of Hassan son of Ishaq. It has been established that his father was a royal immigrant from Bida, in present day Niger state. His great grandfathers hailed from Bida and were stationed in Ibadan for advancing Islam. His father served as the grand Mufti of Ibadanland, a position he held until January 3, 1954. He was a renowned preacher of Islam, who in collaboration with his brother, Abdu Salam bn Muhammad, became famous for his excellent literary abilities, proficiency, and leadership of Muslim communities in West Africa. Abdu Salam bn Muhammad authored books on Islamic studies and preaching in Islam. These include Tuhfatul-Wa muhaditheen wa-lghaafiliin and Sirajul-Wa ‘izeen which were expanded and published by his son Murtadho bn Abeebakrتحفة المحدثين والغافلين للشيخ العلامة مفتى المالكية عبد السلام بن محمد.

Career
Agbotomokekere started learning Qur‘an from Sheikh Isa Shitu Abonde. He later completed the Quranic study under Sheik Ibrahim Abu Bakr. He continued study under Sheikh Shitu Junaid Abonde and Sheikh Abdul Wahid Alafara at Oje. Then he studied under Grand Mufti Sheikh Burhanudeen Sanusi Alaka. He then attended Al-Kharashi Memorial Arabic school, Odo Okun, where he became fluent in Arabic. He completed the Hajj in 1975. He continued Arabic and Islamic studies at Oke Agbo in Ijebu Igbo under Islaahudeen society from 1961-1963. He served as a teacher under the Western Region Government at IDC, Akinkunmi Adifa, Akinyele Local Government. He then joined the staff of Kharashi memorial school (the first formally established Arabic and Islamic centre in the South West region of Nigeria in 1970.

He educated scholars in various branches of Islamic studies. He is one of the preachers of Islam in Ibadanland appointed by the then chief Imam Mudathir Abdul-Salam on 23 January 1989. He was appointed by the late chief Imam Shuarau Baosari Harun as Ashura Lecturer. He was installed and turbaned to succeed his father (as Magaji) in 2002 under late chief Imam Shuarau Baosari Harun III. He became Mogaji Barika Jum ‘ah in 2007. He was appointed the chief Mufassir for Ibadan in 2009 and on 16 November 2013 he was installed as the Grand Mufti for Ibadanland by chief Imam late Alhaj Shu‘arau Baosari III. 

He organizes regular lectures in front of his house and he specifically chose the 9th and 10th of Muharram every year for a special annual lecture; continuing  his father's practice. He undertakes other social responsibilities such as conflict resolution and social development. He became the provost of Kharashi Memorial Arabic College in 1994. He became Chief Imam of Ibadanland on 15 May 2015.

References

1935 births
Living people
African imams
Nigerian Muslims